Le Vigen is a commune in the Haute-Vienne department in the Nouvelle-Aquitaine region in west-central France.

Geography
The village lies on the right bank of the Briance, which flows westward through the commune.

History
The village is said to be the place where Saint Thillo (c. 608–702) died. The church of Saint Mathurin was later built over the oratory where the saint died, although no trace of the oratory has survived.

See also
Communes of the Haute-Vienne department

References

Communes of Haute-Vienne